Cornwall Bridge is a census-designated place (CDP) comprising the hamlets of Cornwall Bridge and Calhoun Corners in the towns of Cornwall and Sharon, Litchfield County, Connecticut, United States. It is primarily in the southwest corner of the town of Cornwall but extends west across the Housatonic River into the town of Sharon in the northern part of the CDP. U.S. Route 7 runs the length of the CDP, following the east side of the Housatonic River and crossing it on the Cornwall Bridge in the northern part of the CDP.

Cornwall Bridge was first listed as a CDP prior to the 2020 census.

References 

Census-designated places in Litchfield County, Connecticut
Census-designated places in Connecticut